Jigsaw is a fashion clothing retailer with store and concession partners across Britain, Ireland, the Netherlands and Australia. The company is based on Mortlake Road in Kew, south west London. The group turned over £102m for the 2017/2018 period. It has circa 80 stores across the UK (as of August 2019). Jigsaw's sister company Kew 159 closed in 2012 following heavy financial losses.

History
The company was started in 1970 by John Robinson, and is now jointly owned by Best Dressed Group and Robinson Property. Robinson (born 1948), who grew up in Herefordshire, went on a holiday to Turkey and brought back a sheepskin coat. People wanted a coat like his, so he and Webster went back to Istanbul and filled an old Post Office van with sixty coats and sold them back in the UK. Robinson lives on a farm in Wiltshire.

The company launched menswear in 1994, and produced it successfully for five years, selling clothes designed by Chris Bailey. In 1998, the same year that the menswear range was bringing in an annual turnover of £15 million, a Jigsaw ensemble was chosen as the men's outfit for the Dress of the Year. In 1999, Bailey bought out Jigsaw Menswear, rebranded it 'Uth' (pronounced 'Youth'), and offered more adventurous designs at higher prices, only to close down in 2002. In 2012, Jigsaw relaunched its menswear brand under the direction of Frances Walker, formerly of Nicole Farhi.

Jigsaw Junior was established in 1996 to further extend the range, however, this line consists only of girls clothing. The same year they opened stores in Tokyo and Denmark.

In November 2006, Catherine Middleton became employed at the company as an assistant accessories buyer. She worked four days a week during a part-time schedule to manage the demands of her high-profile relationship with Prince William before leaving to work at the family business a year later.

References

External links
 December 2005 article in The Times
 December 2006 article in The Daily Telegraph

Clothing companies based in London
Kew, London
Companies based in the London Borough of Richmond upon Thames
British companies established in 1972
Clothing companies established in 1972
Retail companies established in 1972
1972 establishments in England
1970s fashion
Clothing companies of England
Clothing retailers of England